Seothyra fasciata, one of the buck spoor spiders, is a sand-dwelling species of Eresidae. It is native to southern Africa.

Range
It is native to sandy regions of southern Namibia (Kalahari to Naukluft), Botswana and northern South Africa.

References

 Dippenaar-Schoeman A. S. Foord S. and Haddad C. 2013. Spiders of the Savanna Biome. University of Venda & Agricultural Research Council.
 Dippenaar-Schoeman, A. S. (1991). A revision of the African spider genus Seothyra Purcell (Araneae: Eresidae). Cimbebasia 12: 135-160.
 Dippenaar-Schoeman A. S. 2014. Field Guide of the Spiders of South Africa. Lapa Publisher 424 pp.
 Dippenaar-Schoeman A. S., Haddad C. R., Foord S. H., Lyle R., Lotz L. N., Helberg L., Mathebula S., Van Den Berg A., Van Den Berg A. M., Van Niekerk E. and Jocqué R. 2010. First Atlas of the Spiders of South Africa. South African National Survey of Arachnida. SANSA Technical Report version 1 (2010): 1158 pp.
 Foord S. H., Dippenaar-Schoeman A.S. and Haddad C.R. 2011. The faunistic diversity of spiders (Arachnida, Araneae) of the Savanna Biome in South Africa. Transactions of the Royal Society of South Africa 66: 170-201.
 Purcell W. F. 1904. Descriptions of new genera and species of South African spiders. Transactions of the South African Philosophical Society 15: 115-173.

Eresidae
Spiders of Africa
Taxa named by William Frederick Purcell
Spiders described in 1903